BBC Select is a streaming service in North America launched in February 2021. The service is owned by the BBC's commercial arm, BBC Studios, and features documentaries and factual programming previously shown in the United Kingdom on the BBC and shows from other British broadcasters, such as Channel 4's Grayson Perry's Big American Road Trip. It is available as an Amazon Prime Video Channel, and via Apple TV and Roku.
BBC Select was one of the first BBC properties to use the 2021 logo in Reith font, just before its official debut on 20 October 2021.

References

External links 

BBC
Subscription video on demand services
2021 establishments in the United States
Internet properties established in 2021